Ackerman may refer to:

Surname
Ackerman (surname), people with the surname Ackerman

Places
Ackerman, Mississippi, town in Choctaw County, Mississippi, US
Ackerman, West Virginia, former unincorporated community in Mineral County, West Virginia, US
Ackerman Island, sandbar in the Arkansas River near Wichita, Kansas, US
Ackerman Nunatak, ridge of the Pensacola Mountains, Antarctica
Ackerman Ridge, ridge of the Queen Maud Mountains, Antarctica
 Akkerman

Other uses
Ackerman House (disambiguation)
Ackerman syndrome, medical disease
Ackermann steering geometry

See also
Ackerman McQueen
Ackermans (disambiguation)
Ackermann (disambiguation)
Akkerman (disambiguation)
Åkerman, a Swedish surname